Pedomicrobium ferrugineum is a rod-shaped, aerobic to microaerophillic bacterium from the genus of Pedomicrobium with one polar or supolar flagellum. Pedomicrobium ferrugineum has been isolated from podzolic soil in north Germany

References

Further reading 
 

Hyphomicrobiales
Bacteria described in 1961